The 2003 Pittsburgh Pirates season was the 122nd season of the franchise; the 117th in the National League. This was their third season at PNC Park. The Pirates finished fourth in the National League Central with a record of 75–87 and missed the playoffs for the 11th consecutive season.

Offseason
November 25, 2002: Randall Simon was traded by the Detroit Tigers to the Pittsburgh Pirates for a player to be named later and Adrian Burnside (minors). The Pittsburgh Pirates sent Roberto Novoa (December 16, 2002) to the Detroit Tigers to complete the trade.
January 28, 2003: Jeff D'Amico was signed as a free agent with the Pittsburgh Pirates.
March 14, 2003: Kenny Lofton signed as a free agent with the Pittsburgh Pirates.

Regular season
June 24, 2003 – Brad Wilkerson of the Montreal Expos hit for the cycle in a game against the Pirates.

Season standings

Game log

|- style="background:#cfc;"
| 1 || March 31 || @ Reds || 10–1 || Benson (1–0) || Haynes || — || 42,343 || 1–0
|- style="background:#cfc;"
| 2 || April 2 || @ Reds || 7–4 || Torres (1–0) || Manzanillo || Williams (1) || 22,878 || 2–0
|- style="background:#cfc;"
| 3 || April 3 || @ Reds || 7–5 || Fogg (1–0) || Anderson || Williams (2) || 26,096 || 3–0
|- style="background:#cfc;"
| 4 || April 4 || @ Phillies || 9–1 || Suppan (1–0) || Roa || Torres (1) || 59,269 || 4–0
|- style="background:#fbb;"
| 5 || April 5 || @ Phillies || 1–16 || Silva || D'Amico (0–1) || — || 22,693 || 4–1
|- style="background:#cfc;"
| 6 || April 6 || @ Phillies || 2–0 || Benson (2–0) || Myers || Williams (3) || 30,113 || 5–1
|- style="background:#fbb;"
| 7 || April 8 || Brewers || 3–5 || Rusch || Wells (0–1) || DeJean || 36,003 || 5–2
|- style="background:#fbb;"
| 8 || April 9 || Brewers || 2–3 || Ritchie || Fogg (1–1) || DeJean || 23,332 || 5–3
|- style="background:#cfc;"
| 9 || April 10 || Brewers || 3–1 || Suppan (2–0) || Sheets || Williams (4) || 10,384 || 6–3
|- style="background:#cfc;"
| 10 || April 11 || @ Cubs || 3–2 || D'Amico (1–1) || Zambrano || Williams (5) || 33,605 || 7–3
|- style="background:#fbb;"
| 11 || April 12 || @ Cubs || 0–4 || Wood || Benson (2–1) || Borowski || 35,226 || 7–4
|- style="background:#fbb;"
| 12 || April 13 || @ Cubs || 3–4 || Farnsworth || Boehringer (0–1) || Borowski || 29,558 || 7–5
|- style="background:#fbb;"
| 13 || April 15 || Mets || 1–3 || Glavine || Fogg (1–2) || Benitez || 14,728 || 7–6
|- style="background:#cfc;"
| 14 || April 16 || Mets || 6–3 || Suppan (3–0) || Cone || — || 12,609 || 8–6
|- style="background:#fbb;"
| 15 || April 17 || Mets || 2–7 || Seo || D'Amico (1–2) || — || 11,299 || 8–7
|- style="background:#fbb;"
| 16 || April 18 || Cubs || 2–7 || Clement || Benson (2–2) || — || 15,037 || 8–8
|- style="background:#fbb;"
| 17 || April 19 || Cubs || 1–6 (10) || Prior || Sauerbeck (0–1) || — || 31,518 || 8–9
|- style="background:#cfc;"
| 18 || April 20 || Cubs || 8–2 || Torres (2–0) || Estes || — || 14,854 || 9–9
|- style="background:#cfc;"
| 19 || April 22 || Giants || 5–2 || Suppan (4–0) || Foppert || — || 10,650 || 10–9
|- style="background:#fbb;"
| 20 || April 23 || Giants || 3–4 (13) || Brower || Tavarez (0–1) || — || 13,009 || 10–10
|- style="background:#fbb;"
| 21 || April 24 || Giants || 1–3 || Moss || Benson (2–3) || Worrell || 15,967 || 10–11
|- style="background:#fbb;"
| 22 || April 25 || Dodgers || 2–5 || Brohawn || Williams (0–1) || Gagne || 16,090 || 10–12
|- style="background:#fbb;"
| 23 || April 26 || Dodgers || 3–4 || Nomo || Sauerbeck (0–2) || Gagne || 22,267 || 10–13
|- style="background:#fbb;"
| 24 || April 27 || Dodgers || 2–6 || Ishii || Suppan (4–1) || — || 19,679 || 10–14
|- style="background:#cfc;"
| 25 || April 29 || @ Padres || 7–2 || D'Amico (2–2) || Eaton || — || 15,556 || 11–14
|- style="background:#cfc;"
| 26 || April 30 || @ Padres || 8–5 || Benson (3–3) || Perez || Williams (6) || 13,845 || 12–14
|-

|- style="background:#cfc;"
| 27 || May 1 || @ Padres || 5–2 || Wells (1–1) || Peavy || Williams (7) || 13,420 || 13–14
|- style="background:#cfc;"
| 28 || May 2 || @ Dodgers || 5–3 || Beimel (1–0) || Quantrill || Williams (8) || 53,820 || 14–14
|- style="background:#fbb;"
| 29 || May 3 || @ Dodgers || 1–4 || Dreifort || Suppan (4–2) || Gagne || 45,737 || 14–15
|- style="background:#fbb;"
| 30 || May 4 || @ Dodgers || 2–3 || Brown || D'Amico (2–3) || Gagne || 40,544 || 14–16
|- style="background:#fbb;"
| 31 || May 5 || @ Astros || 1–8 || Miller || Benson (3–4) || — || 22,765 || 14–17
|- style="background:#fbb;"
| 32 || May 6 || @ Astros || 9–10 || Bland || Sauerbeck (0–3) || Wagner || 27,023 || 14–18
|- style="background:#fbb;"
| 33 || May 7 || @ Astros || 4–13 || Dotel || Tavarez (0–2) || — || 22,706 || 14–19
|- style="background:#fbb;"
| 34 || May 8 || @ Astros || 2–6 || Stone || Suppan (4–3) || — || 28,836 || 14–20
|- style="background:#fbb;"
| 35 || May 9 || Diamondbacks || 0–5 || Schilling || D'Amico (2–4) || — || 18,080 || 14–21
|- style="background:#cfc;"
| 36 || May 10 || Diamondbacks || 5–4 || Benson (4–4) || Dessens || Williams (9) || 30,776 || 15–21
|- style="background:#fbb;"
| 37 || May 11 || Diamondbacks || 1–2 || Batista || Wells (1–2) || Mantei || 14,976 || 15–22
|- style="background:#fbb;"
| 38 || May 12 || Astros || 4–9 || Stone || Torres || — || 9,095 || 15–23
|- style="background:#fbb;"
| 39 || May 13 || Astros || 3–6 || Munro || Williams || Wagner || 10,535 || 15–24
|- style="background:#cfc;"
| 40 || May 14 || Astros || 3–2 || D'Amico || Miller || Williams (10) || 11,730 || 16–24
|- style="background:#fbb;"
| 41 || May 15 || Astros || 2–6 || Oswalt || Benson || — || 16,752 || 16–25
|- style="background:#cfc;"
| 42 || May 16 || @ Diamondbacks || 8–5 (12) || Boehringer || Mantei || Williams (11) || 31,578 || 17–25
|- style="background:#cfc;"
| 43 || May 17 || @ Diamondbacks || 8–5 || Torres || Capuano || Williams (12) || 42,858 || 18–25
|- style="background:#fbb;"
| 44 || May 18 || @ Diamondbacks || 6–8 || Webb || Suppan (4–4) || — || 34,669 || 18–26
|- style="background:#cfc;"
| 45 || May 21 || Cubs || 5–2 || D'Amico || Wood || Williams (13) || 35,086 || 19–26
|- style="background:#fbb;"
| 46 || May 22 || Cubs || 2–3 || Remlinger || Sauerbeck || Borowski || 14,544 || 19–27
|- style="background:#fbb;"
| 47 || May 23 || Cardinals || 8–10 (10) || Eldred || Meadows || Fassero || 18,660 || 19–28
|- style="background:#fbb;"
| 48 || May 24 || Cardinals || 0–6 || Morris || Suppan (4–5) || — || 35,733 || 19–29
|- style="background:#cfc;"
| 49 || May 25 || Cardinals || 8–7 || Boehringer || Hermanson || Williams (14) || 25,983 || 20–29
|- style="background:#cfc;"
| 50 || May 26 || @ Cubs || 10–0 || Fogg || Wood || — || 40,225 || 21–29
|- style="background:#cfc;"
| 51 || May 27 || @ Cubs || 9–4 || Benson || Clement || — || 35,961 || 22–29
|- style="background:#fbb;"
| 52 || May 28 || @ Cubs || 4–5 || Prior || D'Amico || Borowski || 32,406 || 22–30
|- style="background:#cfc;"
| 53 || May 30 || @ Cardinals || 7–3 || Suppan (5–5) || Stephenson || — || 30,599 || 23–30
|- style="background:#cfc;"
| 54 || May 31 || @ Cardinals || 4–3 || Wells || Williams || Williams (15) || 43,789 || 24–30
|-

|- style="background:#fbb;"
| 55 || June 1 || @ Cardinals || 4–5 || Kline || Beimel || Fassero || 46,103 || 24–31
|- style="background:#fbb;"
| 56 || June 4 || Red Sox || 4–11 || Kim || Benson || — || — || 24–32
|- style="background:#fbb;"
| 57 || June 4 || Red Sox || 3–8 || Lowe || D'Amico || — || 27,769 || 24–33
|- style="background:#cfc;"
| 58 || June 5 || Red Sox || 5–4 || Boehringer || Mendoza || Williams (16) || 33,372 || 25–33
|- style="background:#fbb;"
| 59 || June 7 || @ Braves || 6–8 || Hernandez || Boehringer || Smoltz || 35,397 || 25–34
|- style="background:#fbb;"
| 60 || June 8 || @ Braves || 5–6 || Hodges || Fogg || Smoltz || 29,869 || 25–35
|- style="background:#fbb;"
| 61 || June 10 || @ Blue Jays || 8–13 || Lidle || Benson || — || 14,090 || 25–36
|- style="background:#fbb;"
| 62 || June 11 || @ Blue Jays || 5–8 || Halladay || D'Amico || — || 32,036 || 25–37
|- style="background:#fbb;"
| 63 || June 12 || @ Blue Jays || 4–5 || Hendrickson || Suppan (5–6) || Politte || 15,015 || 25–38
|- style="background:#fbb;"
| 64 || June 13 || @ Devil Rays || 1–7 || Zambrano || Wells || — || 9,487 || 25–39
|- style="background:#cfc;"
| 65 || June 14 || @ Devil Rays || 12–9 || Fogg || Bell || Williams (17) || 14,063 || 26–39
|- style="background:#cfc;"
| 66 || June 15 || @ Devil Rays || 9–5 || Sauerbeck || Levine || Williams (18)|| 13,943 || 27–39
|- style="background:#cfc;"
| 67 || June 18 || Expos || 7–3 || D'Amico || Hernandez || Williams (19) || — || 28–39
|- style="background:#cfc;"
| 68 || June 18 || Expos || 4–3 || Torres || Biddle || — || 22,557 || 29–39
|- style="background:#fbb;"
| 69 || June 19 || Expos || 2–5 || Ohka || Torres || Biddle || 16,050 || 29–40
|- style="background:#cfc;"
| 70 || June 20 || Indians || 5–4 (15) || Torres || Baez || — || 26,305 || 30–40
|- style="background:#cfc;"
| 71 || June 21 || Indians || 7–6 (15) || Sauerbeck || Miceli || — || 36,856 || 31–40
|- style="background:#fbb;"
| 72 || June 22 || Indians || 5–8 || Sabathia || Vogelsong || Baez || 37,803 || 31–41
|- style="background:#fbb;"
| 73 || June 23 || @ Expos || 0–3 || Vargas || Suppan (5–7) || Biddle || 5,641 || 31–42
|- style="background:#fbb;"
| 74 || June 24 || @ Expos || 4–6 || Ohka || D'Amico || Biddle || 5,872 || 31–43
|- style="background:#cfc;"
| 75 || June 25 || @ Expos || 6–5 || Sauerbeck || Eischen || Williams (20) || 5,717 || 32–43
|- style="background:#cfc;"
| 76 || June 27 || Rockies || 5–3 || Fogg || Jennings || Williams (21) || 37,566 || 33–43
|- style="background:#fbb;"
| 77 || June 28 || Rockies || 4–5 || Neagle || Benson || Jimenez || 25,083 || 33–44
|- style="background:#cfc;"
| 78 || June 29 || Rockies || 9–0 || Suppan (6–7) || Chacon || — || 20,475 || 34–44
|-

|- style="background:#fbb;"
| 79 || July 1 || Reds || 3–5 || Graves || Tavarez || Williamson || 17,803 || 34–45
|- style="background:#fbb;"
| 80 || July 2 || Reds || 3–4 || Heredia || Williams || Williamson || 15,322 || 34–46
|- style="background:#cfc;"
| 81 || July 3 || Reds || 8–7 || Fogg || Dempster || Williams (22) || 19,947 || 35–46
|- style="background:#cfc;"
| 82 || July 4 || Astros || 3–2 || Boehringer || Munro || Williams (23) || 30,082 || 36–46
|- style="background:#cfc;"
| 83 || July 5 || Astros || 4–3 || Suppan (7–7) || Saarloos || Williams (24) || 22,258 || 37–46
|- style="background:#cfc;"
| 84 || July 6 || Astros || 8–3 || D'Amico || Miller || — || 18,741 || 38–46
|- style="background:#fbb;"
| 85 || July 7 || @ Brewers || 2–9 || Franklin || Wells || — || 12,322 || 38–47
|- style="background:#cfc;"
| 86 || July 8 || @ Brewers || 8–7 (10) || Williams || DeJean || Torres (2) || 12,425 || 39–47
|- style="background:#fbb;"
| 87 || July 9 || @ Brewers || 1–2 (12) || Kieschnick || Beimel || — || 22,490 || 39–48
|- style="background:#cfc;"
| 88 || July 10 || @ Brewers || 5–4 || Suppan (8–7) || Ford || — || 21,190 || 40–48
|- style="background:#fbb;"
| 89 || July 11 || @ Astros || 2–4 || Miller || D'Amico || Wagner || 31,474 || 40–49
|- style="background:#cfc;"
| 90 || July 12 || @ Astros || 5–2 || Wells || Oswalt || Williams (25) || 34,762 || 41–49
|- style="background:#fbb;"
| 91 || July 13 || @ Astros || 2–5 || Redding || Fogg || Wagner || 32,273 || 41–50
|- style="background:#fbb;"
| 92 || July 17 || Brewers || 5–7 || Franklin || Benson || Estrella || 32,304 || 41–51
|- style="background:#cfc;"
| 93 || July 18 || Brewers || 7–2 || Suppan (9–7) || Rusch || — || 31,697 || 42–51
|- style="background:#fbb;"
| 94 || July 19 || Brewers || 0–1 || Sheets || D'Amico || Kolb || 24,461 || 42–52
|- style="background:#cfc;"
| 95 || July 20 || Brewers || 6–3 || Wells || Ford || Lincoln (1) || 22,643 || 43–52
|- style="background:#cfc;"
| 96 || July 21 || Astros || 5–3 || Fogg || Redding || Lincoln (2) || 14,271 || 44–52
|- style="background:#fbb;"
| 97 || July 22 || Astros || 0–2 || Robertson || Torres || Wagner || 16,661 || 44–53
|- style="background:#cfc;"
| 98 || July 23 || @ Reds || 6–5 || Boehringer || Mercker || Lincoln (3) || 27,629 || 45–53
|- style="background:#cfc;"
| 99 || July 24 || @ Reds || 7–5 (11) || Lincoln || Reitsma || — || 35,504 || 46–53
|- style="background:#cfc;"
| 100 || July 25 || @ Cardinals || 10–5 || Meadows || Eldred || — || 45,296 || 47–53
|- style="background:#fbb;"
| 101 || July 26 || @ Cardinals || 8–13 || Williams || Fogg || Isringhausen || 44,249 || 47–54
|- style="background:#fbb;"
| 102 || July 27 || @ Cardinals || 3–4 || Eldred || Lincoln || — || 34,851 || 47–55
|- style="background:#cfc;"
| 103 || July 28 || @ Cardinals || 3–0 || Suppan (10–7) || Tomko || — || 33,977 || 48–55
|- style="background:#fbb;"
| 104 || July 29 || Padres || 7–8 || Roa || Lincoln || Beck || 15,201 || 48–56
|- style="background:#cfc;"
| 105 || July 30 || Padres || 7–2 || Wells || Lawrence || Meadows (1)|| 23,709 || 49–56
|- style="background:#fbb;"
| 106 || July 31 || Padres || 7–10 || Eaton || Fogg || Beck || 18,045 || 49–57
|-

|- style="background:#cfc;"
| 107 || August 1 || Rockies || 12–11 || Sanchez || Bernero || — || 22,413 || 50–57
|- style="background:#cfc;"
| 108 || August 2 || Rockies || 1–0 || Meadows || Jennings || Lincoln (4) || 37,820 || 51–57
|- style="background:#fbb;"
| 109 || August 3 || Rockies || 4–16 || Oliver || D'Amico || Jimenez || 16,839 || 51–58
|- style="background:#fbb;"
| 110 || August 5 || @ Giants || 0–3 || Schmidt || Wells || Worrell || 41,501 || 51–59
|- style="background:#cfc;"
| 111 || August 6 || @ Giants || 2–0 || Tavarez || Ponson || — || 41,662 || 52–59
|- style="background:#fbb;"
| 112 || August 7 || @ Giants || 5–7 || Eyre || Boehringer || Worrell || 42,334 || 52–60
|- style="background:#fbb;"
| 113 || August 8 || @ Rockies || 6–13 || Jimenez || Mahomes || — || 28,362 || 52–61
|- style="background:#cfc;"
| 114 || August 9 || @ Rockies || 10–4 || D'Amico || Oliver || — || 34,611 || 53–61
|- style="background:#cfc;"
| 115 || August 10 || @ Rockies || 5–3 || Figueroa || Chacon || Lincoln (5) || 26,904 || 54–61
|- style="background:#fbb;"
| 116 || August 11 || Cardinals || 4–6 || Haren || Wells || Isringhausen || 17,647 || 54–62
|- style="background:#fbb;"
| 117 || August 12 || Cardinals || 6–10 || Tomko || Fogg || Simontacchi || 21,013 || 54–63
|- style="background:#cfc;"
| 118 || August 13 || Cardinals || 6–5 || Tavarez || Borbon || — || 18,505 || 55–63
|- style="background:#fbb;"
| 119 || August 14 || Cardinals || 3–4 || Stephenson || D'Amico || Isringhausen || 16,157 || 55–64
|- style="background:#cfc;"
| 120 || August 15 || Brewers || 6–3 || Figueroa || Kinney || Tavarez (1) || 21,096 || 56–64
|- style="background:#fbb;"
| 121 || August 16 || Brewers || 4–6 || Vizcaino || Lincoln || Kolb || 28,143 || 56–65
|- style="background:#cfc;"
| 122 || August 17 || Brewers || 5–2 || Fogg || Franklin || Tavarez (2) || 24,092 || 57–65
|- style="background:#fbb;"
| 123 || August 19 || @ Cardinals || 5–13 || Eldred || Beimel || — || 28,869 || 57–66
|- style="background:#cfc;"
| 124 || August 20 || @ Cardinals || 14–0 || D'Amico || Stephenson || — || 25,741 || 58–66
|- style="background:#fbb;"
| 125 || August 21 || @ Cardinals || 3–6 || Eldred || Lincoln || — || 26,849 || 58–67
|- style="background:#fbb;"
| 126 || August 22 || @ Brewers || 2–3 || Franklin || Wells || Kolb || 22,413 || 58–68
|- style="background:#fbb;"
| 127 || August 23 || @ Brewers || 6–7 || Estrella || Corey || — || 25,432 || 58–69
|- style="background:#fbb;"
| 128 || August 24 || @ Brewers || 9–10 || Kolb || Gonzalez || — || 36,238 || 58–70
|- style="background:#cfc;"
| 129 || August 26 || Marlins || 4–3 || Lincoln || Redman || Tavarez (3) || 12,219 || 59–70
|- style="background:#cfc;"
| 130 || August 27 || Marlins || 4–0 || Wells || Penny || — || 18,264 || 60–70
|- style="background:#cfc;"
| 131 || August 28 || Marlins || 5–0 || Fogg || Willis || — || 12,679 || 61–70
|- style="background:#cfc;"
| 132 || August 29 || Braves || 6–5 || Tavarez || Cunnane || — || 27,415 || 62–70
|- style="background:#fbb;"
| 133 || August 30 || Braves || 6–13 || Ramirez || Perez || — || 21,323 || 62–71
|- style="background:#fbb;"
| 134 || August 31 || Braves || 4–10 || Reynolds || D'Amico || — || 23,822 || 62–72
|-

|- style="background:#cfc;"
| 135 || September 2 || @ Marlins || 3–2 || Wells || Willis || Tavarez (4) || 10,327 || 63–72
|- style="background:#fbb;"
| 136 || September 3 || @ Marlins || 0–3 || Beckett || Fogg || Urbina || 11,135 || 63–73
|- style="background:#fbb;"
| 137 || September 4 || @ Marlins || 1–5 || Tejera || Torres || — || 10,213 || 63–74
|- style="background:#fbb;"
| 138 || September 5 || @ Braves || 2–3 (10) || Cunnane || Corey || — || — || 63–75
|- style="background:#cfc;"
| 139 || September 5 || @ Braves || 5–3 || Corey || Reynolds || Tavarez (5) || 31,849 || 64–75
|- style="background:#fbb;"
| 140 || September 6 || @ Braves || 2–9 || Maddux || D'Amico || — || 36,932 || 64–76
|- style="background:#fbb;"
| 141 || September 7 || @ Braves || 1–2 || Hampton || Wells || Cunnane || 27,703 || 64–77
|- style="background:#cfc;"
| 142 || September 8 || @ Reds || 9–1 || Fogg || Bale || — || 19,073 || 65–77
|- style="background:#fbb;"
| 143 || September 9 || @ Reds || 6–10 || Belisle || Boehringer || — || 21,241 || 65–78
|- style="background:#cfc;"
| 144 || September 10 || @ Reds || 3–2 || Lincoln || Reitsma || Tavarez (6) || 20,560 || 66–78
|- style="background:#fbb;"
| 145 || September 11 || @ Reds || 2–3 || Randall || D'Amico || Reitsma || 20,479 || 66–79
|- style="background:#cfc;"
| 146 || September 12 || Phillies || 8–4 || Wells || Telemaco || — || 18,895 || 67–79
|- style="background:#cfc;"
| 147 || September 13 || Phillies || 5–3 || Fogg || Millwood || Tavarez (7) || 33,480 || 68–79
|- style="background:#fbb;"
| 148 || September 14 || Phillies || 7–10 || Wolf || Torres || Williams || 16,383 || 68–80
|- style="background:#cfc;"
| 149 || September 15 || Reds || 6–3 || Vogelsong || Van Poppel || Tavarez (8) || 8,565 || 69–80
|- style="background:#fbb;"
| 150 || September 16 || Reds || 4–12 || Harang || Perez || Reith || 11,995 || 69–81
|- style="background:#cfc;"
| 151 || September 17 || Reds || 8–5 || D'Amico || Etherton || Tavarez (9) || 10,625 || 70–81
|- style="background:#cfc;"
| 152 || September 18 || Reds || 7–0 || Wells || Randall || — || 10,390 || 71–81
|- style="background:#fbb;"
| 153 || September 19 || Cubs || 9–10 || Veres || Figueroa || Borowski || — || 71–82
|- style="background:#cfc;"
| 154 || September 19 || Cubs || 10–6 || Torres || Cruz || — || 16,248 || 72–82
|- style="background:#cfc;"
| 155 || September 20 || Cubs || 8–2 || Vogelsong || Clement || — || 32,869 || 73–82
|- style="background:#fbb;"
| 156 || September 21 || Cubs || 1–4 || Prior || Perez || Borowski || 21,497 || 73–83
|- style="background:#fbb;"
| 157 || September 23 || @ Mets || 0–1 || Leiter || Wells || — || 17,830 || 73–84
|- style="background:#fbb;"
| 158 || September 24 || @ Mets || 3–5 || Trachsel || D'Amico || Stanton || 22,134 || 73–85
|- style="background:#cfc;"
| 159 || September 25 || @ Mets || 3–1 || Torres || Roberts || Tavarez (10) || 25,081 || 74–85
|- style="background:#fbb;"
| 160 || September 27 || @ Cubs || 2–4 || Prior || Fogg || Borowski || — || 74–86
|- style="background:#fbb;"
| 161 || September 27 || @ Cubs || 2–7 || Clement || Vogelsong || — || 40,121 || 74–87
|- style="background:#cfc;"
| 162 || September 28 || @ Cubs || 3–2 || Wells || Cruz || Tavarez (11) || 39,940 || 75–87
|-

|-
| Legend:       = Win       = LossBold = Pirates team member

Record vs. opponents

Detailed records

Roster

Opening Day lineup

Awards and honors

2003 Major League Baseball All-Star Game
Mike Williams, P, reserve

Statistics
Hitting
Note: G = Games played; AB = At bats; H = Hits; Avg. = Batting average; HR = Home runs; RBI = Runs batted in

Pitching
Note: G = Games pitched; IP = Innings pitched; W = Wins; L = Losses; ERA = Earned run average; SO = Strikeouts

Transactions
 July 22, 2003: Brandon Lyon was traded by the Boston Red Sox with Anastacio Martinez to the Pittsburgh Pirates for Mike Gonzalez and Scott Sauerbeck.
 July 23, 2003: Kenny Lofton was traded by the Pittsburgh Pirates with Aramis Ramírez and cash to the Chicago Cubs for a player to be named later, Jose Hernandez, and Matt Bruback (minors). The Chicago Cubs sent Bobby Hill (August 15, 2003) to the Pittsburgh Pirates to complete the trade.
July 31, 2003: Freddy Sanchez was traded by the Boston Red Sox with Mike Gonzalez and cash to the Pittsburgh Pirates for Brandon Lyon, Jeff Suppan, and Anastacio Martinez.
August 17, 2003: Randall Simon was traded by the Pittsburgh Pirates to the Chicago Cubs for Ray Sadler.
August 26, 2003: Jason Bay was traded by the San Diego Padres with a player to be named later and Óliver Pérez to the Pittsburgh Pirates for Brian Giles. The San Diego Padres sent Corey Stewart (minors) (October 2, 2003) to the Pittsburgh Pirates to complete the trade.

Draft picks

Note
Age at time of draft.

Farm system

LEAGUE CHAMPIONS: Williamsport, DSL Pirates

References

 2003 Pittsburgh Pirates at Baseball Reference
 2003 Pittsburgh Pirates  at Baseball Almanac

Pittsburgh Pirates seasons
Pittsburgh Pirates Season, 2003
Pittsburgh Pirates Season, 2003
Pittsburgh Pirates